Annie Live! is an American musical television special that aired on NBC on December 2, 2021. It was a performance of the 1977 Broadway musical Annie, which is based on the comic strip Little Orphan Annie by Harold Gray. The production was the fourth on-screen version of the musical following the 1982 theatrical film starring Carol Burnett and Albert Finney (in which the songs "Sign" and "We Got Annie" were taken from), the 1999 television film starring Kathy Bates and Victor Garber and the 2014 theatrical film starring Cameron Diaz and Jamie Foxx.

The special starred newcomer Celina Smith as the titular role, Harry Connick Jr. as Daddy Warbucks, Taraji P. Henson as Miss Hannigan, Nicole Scherzinger as Grace Farrell, Tituss Burgess as Rooster Hannigan, and Megan Hilty as Lily St. Regis. The special was directed by Lear deBessonet and Alex Rudzinski.

Plot 
At the orphanage in New York City it is 3 in the morning and one of the girls has a nightmare. Some of the girls are annoyed at being waked up. Annie tries to comfort the girl. Miss Hannigan comes in and tells the girls to take everything off their beds and scrub the floors, even though by this time it is 4 in the morning. They perform "It's the Hard-Knock Life" and Annie sneaks into the cart which the laundry man will take with him.

Annie discovers the dog Sandy and performs "Tomorrow". A cop asks Annie what she is doing out at night and about the dog. Annie claims it is hers and the cop tells her to put the dog on a better leash and give it a license. Then Annie encounters a Hooverville, where the homeless complain about former president Hoover and what has happened to their lives. A cop runs everyone off and Annie is returned to the orphanage.

Grace shows up at the orphanage and mentions the office in charge, leading Miss Hannigan to believe she is there to inspect the place. No, in fact, Grace is there to select an orphan to spend Christmas 1933 with Oliver Warbucks, a billionaire. Annie is there and when Miss Hannigan asks what qualities the orphan should have, Annie appears to meet all the requirements. So she gets to spend Christmas in this fabulous mansion of Fifth Avenue. When she arrives everything and everyone is so nice, and Annie and the cast perform "I Think I'm Gonna Like It Here".

Warbucks arrives back at home after several weeks of touring his factories, many of which are closing, and he's not happy. President Roosevelt is one of many who has left a phone message but even he isn't important enough to call back right away, since Warbucks is a Republican. Seeing Annie, Warbucks wonders why Grace brought a girl because an orphan is supposed to be a boy. Still, Annie wins the man over and, while Warbucks was going to spend the evening catching up on work, he takes Annie and Grace to see a Broadway show.

Miss Hannigan gets a visit from her brother Rooster with Lily, his latest girlfriend, and they perform "Easy Street".

Warbucks likes Annie so much that he wants to adopt her. When he gives Annie a locket to replace her old one, she gets very upset because her real parents will come back for her, according to the note left with her when she was abandoned. She has half a locket and they have the other half. When the two halves match, that's how Annie will know she has found her real parents. Warbucks agrees to search for Annie's parents, calling "J. Edgar" to put his best men on it. Warbucks and Annie go on the Bert Healy's NBC radio show and Warbucks offers a $50,000 reward if Annie's parents are found.

Hearing about the reward, Rooster and Lily put on disguises and succeed in fooling Miss Hannigan. They say they will claim to be Annie's long-lost parents from Canada, who were having a hard time when they gave her up, but now they are fine. They agree to split the reward money with Miss Hannigan, who was sent items after a fire that belong to Annie. This includes the locket that will prove who her parents are.

Warbucks and Annie visit President Roosevelt, who is meeting with his cabinet. They do not know what to do about the economy, but a woman on the radio is criticizing Roosevelt. Annie starts singing "Tomorrow" and the others join in. FDR can only speak the words. Then he announces Annie has inspired him to create government jobs so people won't have to take handouts--a "New Deal". Warbucks receives a telegram telling him to come right home.

Grace has screened numerous potential parents for Annie and all have lied. When Annie arrives home, she is given the sad news. Also, Eliot Ness has sent the news that the locket given to Annie was very common and it would be impossible to track down the people who bought it. Warbucks says if Annie's real parents cannot be found, he will adopt her, and the cast sings "I Don't Need Anything But You".

Then Mr. and Mrs. Mudge show up, with proof they are Annie's parents. This includes a birth certificate, and the most important thing, the locket. But there is little excitement. Everyone seems disappointed. Warbucks mentions the reward, and Mr. Mudge, actually Rooster, refuses the reward money at first. Then he realizes they can take the $50,000 and give Annie a nice life in the country in New Jersey. However, Mr. and Mrs. Mudge will have to come back tomorrow.

The next morning, Warbucks has news. J. Edgar Hoover has determined Annie's real parents are deceased. And there is more news: the real identities of Mr. and Mrs. Mudge have been found to be Rooster and Lily. So when they show up, cops are there to take them away, and so is FDR. Miss Hannigan also shows up, with all of Annie's friends, and tries to claim the reward, but she is told she is an accomplice and will have to be arrested as well. Annie pleads for Miss Hannigan to go free, and Warbucks agrees she will be given a job--just not taking care of orphans. Then the entire cast celebrates because Annie and Molly will be adopted by "Daddy Warbucks", as Annie calls him for the first time.

Cast and characters
 Celina Smith as Annie Bennett Warbucks 
 Harry Connick Jr. as Oliver "Daddy" Warbucks
 Taraji P. Henson as Miss Hannigan
 Nicole Scherzinger as Grace Farrell, chief of staff to Oliver Warbucks
 Tituss Burgess as Rooster Hannigan
 Megan Hilty as Lily St. Regis
 Jeff Kready as Bert Healy
 Alan Toy as Franklin Delano Roosevelt
 McKenzie Kurtz as Star to Be
 Arwen Monzon-Sanders as Duffy
 Audrey Cymone as Pepper
 Cate Elefante as Kate
 Felice Kakaletris as Molly
 Sophie Knapp as July
 Tessa Frascogna as Tessie
 Jacob Keith Watson as Mr. Bundles
 Kennedy Rae Thompson as Orphan

Musical numbers
 "Overture" – Orchestra
 "Maybe" – Annie and Orphans
 "It's the Hard-Knock Life" – Annie and Orphans
 "It's the Hard Knock Life" (Reprise)" † – Orphans 
 "Tomorrow" – Annie
 "We'd Like to Thank You, Herbert Hoover" – Hooverville-ites
 "Little Girls" – Miss Hannigan
 "Little Girls" (Reprise)" † – Miss Hannigan
 "I Think I'm Gonna Like It Here" – Grace, Annie, and Staff
 "N.Y.C." – Warbucks, Grace, Annie, Star to Be, and New Yorkers
 "Sign" * – Miss Hannigan and Warbucks
 "Easy Street" – Rooster, Miss Hannigan, and Lily
 "We Got Annie" * – Grace and Staff
 "Maybe (Reprise)" † - Grace and Annie
 "You're Never Fully Dressed Without a Smile" – Bert Healy, Boylan Sisters, and Orphans
 "Easy Street (Reprise)" † - Rooster and Lily
 "Tomorrow (Cabinet Reprise)" – Annie, F.D.R., Warbucks, and Cabinet
 "Something Was Missing" – Warbucks
 "I Don't Need Anything But You" – Annie, Warbucks, and Staff
 "Maybe (Warbucks' Reprise)" – Warbucks
 "Annie/I Don't Need Anything But You (Reprise)" † – Company
 "A New Deal For Christmas" - Company
 "Tomorrow" (Finale) – Company

 † Denote reprises that were not included on the accompanying soundtrack.
 * Denote songs written for the 1982 film adaptation.

Production

Development
The project was announced by NBC on May 12, 2021 with Alex Rudzinski as the live television director and Lear deBessonet as the program director. It was also announced that Sergio Trujillo would choreograph the production. Other members of the production team included Emilio Sosa as costume designer, Jason Sherwood as scenic designer and Stephen Oremus providing new orchestrations. The special was executive produced by Rudzinski, Robert Greenblatt and Neil Meron. Rehearsals began in October in New York.

On June 8, 2021, it was announced that Taraji P. Henson had been cast as Miss Hannigan in the production. Later, more casting was announced including Harry Connick Jr. as Daddy Warbucks, Nicole Scherzinger as Grace Farrell, Tituss Burgess as Rooster Hannigan, and Jane Krakowski as Lily St. Regis.

In June 2021, NBC also announced that they would be holding a nationwide audition for the titular role, similarly to the casting of Shanice Williams as Dorothy Gale in The Wiz Live! and Maddie Baillio as Tracy Turnblad in Hairspray Live! Celina Smith was ultimately cast as Annie.

In November 2021, Krakowski stepped down from her role due to a breakthrough case of COVID-19 and would be replaced by Megan Hilty. Also, it was announced that Andrea McArdle, who originated the role of Annie on Broadway, had been cast as Eleanor Roosevelt. McArdle, however, stepped away from the production in late November due to the hospitalization of her father. The part was subsequently written out, however McArdle still appears on the cast recording.

Filming
The broadcast was filmed at Gold Coast Studios in Bethpage, New York.

Release
The special premiered on NBC on December 2, 2021.

Reception
The special, which was broadcast on December 2, 2021 by NBC, received 5.34 million viewers during its airing. After a week, the number of viewers rose to 6.29 million.

Accolades

References

External links

2020s American television specials
Musical television specials
2021 musicals
2021 in American television
2021 television specials
NBC television specials
Little Orphan Annie
American live television shows
Musicals based on comic strips